Ughelli South is a Local Government Area of Delta State, Nigeria. It is made up of six Urhobo kingdoms namely: Ughievwen, Arhavwarien, Effurun Otor, Eghwu, Okparabe and Olomu. Otu Jeremi is the headquarters of Ughelli South LGA. It is the fourth most populated local government in Delta State.

The postal code of the area is 333.

Towns and villages
 Imode (village)
 Egbo-Uhurie
 Ophorigbala
 Ekakpamre
 Otokutu
 Ekrejegbe
 Ekrokpe
 Eyara
 Oginibo
 Urhiephron
 Okwagbe
 Olomu

Notable individuals from Ughelli South
 Akpor Pius Ewherido
 Francis E. Waive - Member of House of Representatives (Nigeria)

References

Local Government Areas in Delta State